The Gene Sarazen Jun Classic, sometimes shortened to Jun Classic, was a professional golf tournament that was held in Japan from 1977 to 1999. It was an event on the Japan Golf Tour from 1978. It was named in honour of Gene Sarazen, and played at the Jun Classic Country Club and the Rope Club in Tochigi Prefecture.

Tournament hosts

Winners

Notes

References

External links
Japan Golf Tour's Official site
Home page of the Jun Classic C.C. 

Former Japan Golf Tour events
Defunct golf tournaments in Japan
Sport in Tochigi Prefecture
1977 establishments in Japan
1999 disestablishments in Japan
Recurring sporting events established in 1977
Recurring sporting events disestablished in 1999